is a Japanese football player who plays for Mito HollyHock in the J2 League.

Club statistics
Updated to 23 February 2018.

References

External links
Profile at Yokohama FC

1990 births
Living people
Ryutsu Keizai University alumni
Association football people from Tokyo
Japanese footballers
Japanese expatriate footballers
J2 League players
K League 1 players
Yokohama FC players
Gangwon FC players
Mito HollyHock players
Suzuka Point Getters players
Association football midfielders
Universiade gold medalists for Japan
Universiade medalists in football
Japanese expatriate sportspeople in South Korea
Expatriate footballers in South Korea
Medalists at the 2011 Summer Universiade